John Kristian Comer (born November 30, 1944) was a Canadian politician. He served in the Legislative Assembly of Saskatchewan from 1971 to 1975, as a NDP member for the constituency of Nipawin.

References

Saskatchewan New Democratic Party MLAs
1944 births
Living people